Victoire Thivisol (born 6 July 1991) is a French film actress.

She first gained acclaim for her role as a child coping with her mother's death in the 1996 film Ponette, becoming the youngest actress to win the Volpi Cup Best Actress Award at the Venice Film Festival. She later went on to star in Children of the Century and Chocolat (2000), both as the daughter of Juliette Binoche. In 2007, she was cast in Les grands s'allongent par terre (2008). The director, Emmanuel Saget, was so impressed with her that he rewrote the film around her character.

Filmography

External links

1991 births
Living people
20th-century French actresses
21st-century French actresses
French child actresses
French film actresses
Volpi Cup for Best Actress winners